Lygia is a given name. Notable people with the name include:

Lygia Bojunga Nunes (born 1932), Brazilian author of children's books
Lygia Clark (1920–1988), Brazilian artist best known for her painting and installation work
Lygia Fagundes Telles (born 1923), Brazilian novelist and short-story writer
Lygia Pape (1927–2004), Brazilian artist, active in both the Concrete and Neo-Concretist movements in Brazil

See also
Ligia (name)
 Ligeia (disambiguation)

es:Lygia